Oscar Mariné Brandi (born 1951 in Madrid, Spain) is a designer, illustrator, expert typographer and professional artist; Oscar Mariné is one of the major communicators in post-Franco Spain. His internationally renowned work includes iconic designs for filmmakers like Pedro Almodóvar, Alex de la Iglesia, and Julio Médem, musicians like Bruce Springsteen, The Psychedelic Furs or Brian Eno, the press (El País, C International Photo Magazine) and a variety of firms (Absolut Vodka, Hugo Boss, Camper, Loewe etc.) He is the founder of OMB Graphic Design studio in Madrid.

Biography
Oscar Mariné Brandi (born 1951 in Madrid, Spain)

Mariné has produced dozens of works of national and international renown in areas as diverse as publishing, corporate communications, film and music. His works bear the precious seal of a total creator, one who unites content, context and various techniques to overcome barriers in graphic design. His organic conception of product design makes him a vital exemplar of contemporary communication methods.

In 1998, Tibor Kalman said of Mariné's work: "It is no longer graphic design. It is communication. Graphic belongs to 1955. Communication means the creator has accepted responsibility for an intense stew of elements (a paella?) which now includes nutrition. Good cooks must balance the full range of effects to be expected from communications and now this includes content, as well as a dizzying array of contents, media and techniques.

Early days - Madrid Me Mata magazine (1980s)
Mariné's multidisciplinary creativity was evident from the start when he was founder and artistic director of the celebrated counter-cultural magazine Madrid Me Mata, where he fused content and form to create an iconic publication during the famed La Movida Madrileña of the 1980s.

As a graphic designer/communicator (1991 to date)
In the area of branding, his projects for Camper, Loewe and Vega Sicilia are well known in Spanish design circles. International achievements include the renowned US advertising campaign for Absolut Vodka Absolut Mariné for Seagram USA, his work for Swatch, Benetton's Fabrica and the Japanese Narizuka Corporation. Also the development of the brand for Sir Norman Foster's architectural studio in London, Foster and Partners, where his concepts remit one to the aesthetics of London in the swinging '60s.

He has an extensive portfolio of editorial projects, and in the world of journalism, in 2007, the Spanish newspaper El País entrusted his studio with the design of their leading editions. The El País Semanal (the Sunday glossy magazine) has recovered its original name, Babelia (the Saturday newspaper's cultural review) has totally transformed its contents. Domingo (the Sunday newspaper's current affairs section) provides in-depth journalism for the weekend. He has also  supervised the overall redesign of the daily newspaper, altering typographic protocols, and giving the content legibility, readability and credibility. Since 2005 Mariné is responsible for the art direction of the exquisite design of the C International Photo Magazine, undoubtedly the most prestigious photographic art magazine in the world published by IvoryPress, London.

Many musicians have requested Mariné's input in the creation of their album covers: Bruce Springsteen, Immaculate Fools, The Psychedelic Furs, Andrés Calamaro, Los Rodríguez, Brian Eno, Kevin Ayers, Siniestro Total, Michel Camilo and Tomatito to name just a few.

His projects for film include iconic posters for All About My Mother by Pedro Almodóvar, The Day of the Beast by Alex de la Iglesia, and Tierra by Julio Médem. This connection with cinema continues with designs for film festivals such as Zinebi International Festival of Documentary and Short Films of Bilbao (Spain), where Mariné's poster was awarded the New York Art Directors Club Award for 2000.

He also designed the official look for the last two editions of the San Sebastián International Film Festival (Spain) and all of its sections. His Federico García Lorca-like designs are featured in the scenery of the renowned flamenco dancer Eva Yerbabuena's show El huso de la memoria.

Current work

Recent projects include the brand for Madrid's new cultural center, Matadero Madrid. This is a place for young people, a place where the search for art and creativity can be fulfilled. Mariné's identity covers all graphic requirements: signage, publications, advertising, in house stationery, etc...

Other work includes: Exhibition Sebastiao Salgado "The Workers" for the National Library Madrid, publications for the Seville 1991 Universal Exposition, various for ICEX - Spanish Institute for Exterior Commerce, art catalogues for the IVAM - Valencia Institute of Modern Art, campaigns for the Junta de Castilla-La Mancha, exhibition graphics for the National Museum of Reina Sofia Center, multitude of projects over the past 15 years for the Huelva Tourist Board, launch for the Spanish Television + Radio- rtve, exhibition for The United Nations, and other works for Sgae-General Association of Authors and Editors, Caja Madrid Group, Santander Bank, 40 Principales, Los Aljibes and Paternina Vineyards, La Ser radio, Canal+, Condé Nast, El Corte Inglés, Santiago Bernabéu Stadium, Hugo Boss, Pepsi, Tissot Watches, Diseño Interior, Cambio 16, Marie Claire España, Amnesty International...

In the El Greco 1900 exhibition organised by the SEACEX (State Corporation for Spanish Cultural Action Abroad) with paintings from the archives of the Museo de El Greco in Toledo, Spain, Mariné achieves a global vision of exhibition design, architecture, illumination, graphics and catalogue. The innovative lighting of the paintings and the installation that allows us to enter the famed The Burial of the Count of Orgaz piece has been defined by critics as a radiant and avant-garde  vision, without falling for typical stereotypes. Inaugurated at the Palacio de Bellas Artes museum in Mexico DF in 2009, it continues itinerant during 2010 at the Bozar Centre for Fine Arts, Brussels.

As an artist (1991 to date)
Mariné's pictorial work has been the subject of solo exhibitions in Tokyo, New York, Milan, Venice, Bologna, Madrid and Ibiza, and also forms a part of many collective shows. The owner of an Expressionist and chromatic stroke, some of his images are an essential component of various brand identities.

Graphic design awards

2010 		National Award of Design. (Premio Nacional de Diseño) Government of Spain.
2002 		Communication Arts Certificate of Excellence: Farewell Casanova	
2001 		The Art Directors Club 80th Annual Award: Zinebi (42) Merit Award 2000 AIGA.
2000		Merit Award AIGA.American Institute of Graphic Arts Certificate of Excellence: All About My Mother	
1997/1998/2000 AEPD Spanish Association of Professional Designers
1996 		Hispanic Creative Award: Summer Issue Cover	
1995 		Hispanic Creative Award for Excellence: Swatch, Huelva, DRO East West/Rumor - Warner Bros. Records

Individual exhibitions
2002		"Mariné" Galería Almirante, Madrid
2003		"Mariné: No Money No Honey" Galería Magenta 52, Milán
2005		"Mariné: Buenos Aires, Videos and Photography" PHotoEspaña 05, Casa de América, Madrid
2005		"Mariné: Buenos Aires, Videos and Photography" Museum of Fine Arts of Bilbao
2006		"Days of Glory" ABA Art Contemporani, Palma de Mallorca
2007		"Latest Serie (screenprints)" Estampa 2007, Madrid
2008		Estampa 2008, Madrid

References

External links
www.oscarmarine.com official website (Spanish and English)
VEGAP, Visual Entidad de Gestión de Artistas Plásticos  (Spanish)
ABC  newspaper article (Spanish)
DIMAD  Asociación de Diseñadores de Madrid / Madrid Designer's Association (Spanish)

Spanish graphic designers
Spanish illustrators
1951 births
Living people